Aruba is scheduled to compete at the 2017 World Aquatics Championships in Budapest, Hungary from 14 July to 30 July.

Swimming

Aruba has received a Universality invitation from FINA to send a maximum of four swimmers (two men and two women) to the World Championships.

Synchronized swimming

Aruba's synchronized swimming team consisted of 1 athlete (1 female).

Women

References

Nations at the 2017 World Aquatics Championships
2017
World Aquatics Championships